Barsbold is a Mongolian given name. Notable people with the name include:

Rinchen Barsbold (born 1935), Mongolian paleontologist and geologist
Ulambayaryn Barsbold, Minister of the Environment for Mongolia

Mongolian given names